Morten Sætra (born 18 June 1997) is a Norwegian football goalkeeper who plays for Strømsgodset.

He is a younger brother of fellow Strømsgodset player Lars Sætra.

Career
Sætra played youth football as a defender until the spring of 2013, and was selected as a Norway youth international as a goalkeeper in 2014. Ahead of the 2016 season he was promoted into Strømsgodset's senior squad.

References

1997 births
Living people
Sportspeople from Drammen
Norwegian footballers
Eliteserien players
Norwegian First Division players
Norwegian Second Division players
Strømsgodset Toppfotball players
Nybergsund IL players
Elverum Fotball players
Strømmen IF players
Association football goalkeepers
Norway youth international footballers